Autódromo Juan Oria is a  motorsports circuit located near Marcos Juárez, Argentina.
The circuit has 10 corners.

References

Motorsport venues in Córdoba Province, Argentina